The Barre-Montpelier Intercities was a primary moniker of the minor league baseball teams based in Barre, Vermont, in partnership with neighboring Montpelier. After playing as members of independent leagues in 1904 to 1906, the Barre-Montpelier Intercities played as members of two leagues in 1907. The Intercities were in first place in both the 1907 New Hampshire State and Vermont State League standings when the leagues permanently folded during the 1907 season. 

Montpelier played in the 1887 Northeastern League, Barre hosted a 1904 Vermont League team, and the 1924 Montpelier team played in the Ontario–Quebec–Vermont League.

History
Beginning in 1887, numerous semi-professional teams played in the Barre-Montpelier area, and Montpelier hosted a team in the Northeastern League. The 1887 league records and standings are unknown as the Montpelier team was managed by Fred Spaulding and William Lord.

In 1904 Barre first had minor league baseball when the city hosted a Barre team in the Independent Vermont League. The records and standings of this league are unknown.

In 1904, Montpelier-Barre began play as members of the Independent Northern New York League along with Burlington, Plattsburgh, Rutland and St. Albans. Montpelier-Barre continued play in the 1905 Northern New York League. League standings and statistics for both seasons are unknown. Arthur Daley managed the team in the 1905 four–team league which included Burlington, Plattsburgh and Rutland.

Montpelier-Barre continued play in joining the 1906 Northern Independent League. Their manager was Tonny Uniac. Other league members were Burlington, Ottawa, Plattsburgh and Rutland. There are no known standings or statistics for the league,

The Barre-Montpelier Intercities were a charter member when the 1907 New Hampshire State League formed as a Class D league. The league members were the Barre-Montpelier Intercities, Burlington Burlingtons, West Manchester (New Hampshire), Laconia/Plattsburgh Brewers, East Manchester (New Hampshire), Franklin, New Hampshire, Nashua, New Hampshire and Concord, New Hampshire teams. The Barre-Montpelier Intercities began league play on May 11, 1907. After four New Hampshire League teams folded early in the season, a meeting was held on June 17, 1907, where the league was restructured. At the meeting, the New Hampshire League was dissolved and the Vermont State League was formed. The Vermont State League was structured as a four–team league, keeping three New Hampshire State League franchises, including Barre-Montpelier and adding an expansion team. Barre-Montpelier and the Vermont State League began play on July 2, 1907.

While playing in the New Hampshire State League, the Barre-Montpelier Intercities had a record of 19–6  and were in 1st place in the standings when the New Hampshire State League folded. The Intercities' manager was A. W. "Punch" Daley.

Continuing play in the newly formed 1907 Vermont State League with Daley as manager, the Barre-Montpelier Intercities were in 1st place with a 12–4 record when the league folded.

Montpelier briefly hosted the 1924 Montpelier Goldfish of the Class B level Ontario–Quebec–Vermont League. The team folded on July 16, 1924, finishing with a 16–37 record under manager Bill McCorry.

Barre, Vermont has not hosted another minor league team.

The ballparks
The Barre-Montpelier teams were noted to have played minor league home games at the Barre Base Ball Grounds between 1904 and 1907. The ballpark was located on Smith Street. It was near Berlin Street & the Jail Branch of the Winooski River in Barre, Vermont. Today, the site contains commercial businesses.

In their brief existence, the 1924 Montpelier Goldfish played at home games Hubbard Park. The park is still in use today and the ballpark was located along 12th Street in Montpelier, Vermont.

Timeline

Year–by–year records

Notable alumni

Jack Coombs (1905)
Joe Evers (1924)
Al Grabowski (1924)
Eddie Grant (baseball) (1905)
Bill McCorry (1924, MGR)
Al Moore (1924)
Shag Shaughnessy (1905)
Tom Stankard (1905)
George Walker (1887)

See also
Montpelier-Barre playersMontpelier Goldfish players

References

External links
Baseball Reference

Defunct minor league baseball teams
Professional baseball teams in Vermont
Defunct baseball teams in Vermont
Baseball teams established in 1887
Barre (city), Vermont
Montpelier, Vermont
Baseball teams disestablished in 1907
New Hampshire State League teams
Vermont State League teams
Ontario–Quebec–Vermont League teams